Landnám was a Norse farmstead in the eastern settlement and it was part of the Viking settlement. It is presently located immediately west of the town of Narsaq.

Farm 
The farm was founded around the year 1000 AD. It was composed of stables, a banqueting hall and an area to sleep.

The total area of the farmstead is pretty small in comparison with Brattahlíð.

Populated places in Greenland